Greg Thomas (born John Gregory Thomas, 12 August 1960) is a Welsh former  cricketer, who played in five Test matches and three One Day Internationals for England between 1986 and 1987.

Life and career
Thomas was born in Trebanos in Glamorgan. He was a genuine fast bowler, a rare sight in English cricket after the retirement of Bob Willis; apart from the raw pace, he was erratic and often had injury problems. At his best, he matched the speed of the fearsome West Indian pacemen on the tour of West Indies in 1985/86, but leaked too many runs with his wayward bowling.  This difficult tour was followed by one Test in England, disruptive injury, and then a fruitless switch to play for Northamptonshire.

Highlights of his brief Test career included participating in a last-wicket stand of 72 with Richard Ellison in his second match, and taking 4-70 in his third. However as he played in a struggling England side, most of his Tests coming against a dominant West Indies side, he jointly holds as of 2022 an unwanted record of playing the most Tests of any England player always to finish on the losing side. He did at least finish on the winning side in one of his one-day internationals against Pakistan, taking two wickets in his first over and helping in the last-wicket stand with Neil Foster that secured a series-clinching victory.

Thomas played for an England XI in limited-over match against a Netherlands XI in 1989. However he then joined the rebel tour to South Africa 1989-90 as a replacement for Philip DeFreitas, defying the international sporting boycott of the apartheid state. Although he took a first-class career-best 7 for 75 for Northamptonshire against Glamorgan the following season, Thomas had further injury problems and did not play for England again. 

The West Indian batsman Viv Richards was notorious for punishing bowlers that dared to sledge him. So much so, that many opposing captains banned their players from the practice. However, in a county game against Glamorgan, Thomas attempted to sledge him after he had played and missed at several balls in a row. He informed Richards: "It's red, round and weighs about five ounces, in case you were wondering".  Richards hammered the next delivery out of the ground and into a nearby river. Turning to the bowler, he commented: "Greg, you know what it looks like, now go and find it".

References

1960 births
Living people
England Test cricketers
England One Day International cricketers
Welsh cricketers
Glamorgan cricketers
Northamptonshire cricketers
Border cricketers
Eastern Province cricketers
People from Glamorgan
Marylebone Cricket Club cricketers